Konstantinos Bogdanos (Greek: Κωνσταντίνος Μπογδάνος, Romanized: Konstantínos Bogdános; Marousi, Athens, December 27, 1979) is a Greek politician and journalist who serves as a Member of the Hellenic Parliament for the electoral district of Athens A after the 2019 elections with New Democracy from which he was expelled from in October 2021. 

He is the founder and current leader of the national conservative Patriotic Force for Change which he formed on the 26th of September, 2022.

Early life 
Bogdanos was born in Marousi, Athens, Greece on December 27, 1979. He studied journalism and communication at Panteion University and did postgraduate studies (MA) in philosophy at King's College London. He has undergone further training, attending seminars on economics at the London School of Economics (LSE).

Media Portrayal and Politics 
Many media organizations have claimed that he belongs to the Far-right in the Greek political scene. He identifies himself as right-wing, liberal and conservative, rejecting the term "far-right".

References

1979 births
Living people
Alumni of King's College London
Politicians from Athens
Journalists from Athens
Greek MPs 2019–2023